Buddhaditya Mohanty is an Indian actor. He was born in Cuttack, completed his schooling at Stewart School, Cuttack and his college education at Ravenshaw College. After that he studied at Delhi University. He works in Mumbai as well as in Odisha. He has worked in a number of successful serials including Meher (tv series), Stree-Teri Kahani, Kumkum, Waaris, Prratima and Kya hua tera wada.

Filmography

Television

References

External links

Male actors from Odisha
People from Cuttack
Living people
1978 births